Bricktown Beach is an artificial beach temporarily installed annually in Bricktown, Oklahoma City, in the U.S. state of Oklahoma. The summer attraction, which features beach sand, lounge chairs and umbrellas, and equipment for volleyball and other games, is installed at Third Base Plaza outside Chickasaw Bricktown Ballpark. Approximately 150 tons of sand is used to create the beach each year. The beach was first installed in 2016.

History
The beach was first installed in 2016, and the concept was conceived after staff members of Bricktown Inc. and Downtown OKC visited Detroit. The beach cost approximately $20,000 and J.E. Dunn Construction offered construction services at no cost.

The beach hosted a volleyball tournament and screening of the film Angels in the Outfield in 2017. The 2017 beach was sponsored by the City of Oklahoma City, Downtown Business Improvement District, JE Dunn Construction Group, and the Oklahoma City Dodgers.

The 2018 edition added a "Beach Hut" staffed by Downtown Guides for distributing equipment and helping visitors. The 2019 beach was sponsored by Downtown Oklahoma City Partnership and the Bricktown Association and built by JE Dunn Construction Group.

References

External links

 Bricktown Beach at Downtown OKC Partnership

2016 establishments in Oklahoma
Beaches of the United States
Bricktown, Oklahoma City
Tourist attractions in Oklahoma City